Clark College is one of the eight residential colleges of Murray State University.  The college was established in the fall of 1996.  The residential college of Lee Clark was named after the prominent farmer, businessman and statesman Mr. Lee Clark, who was a very active board member for 17 years during the formative years of Murray State University. Since the mid-1990s, students associated with Clark College have initiated some great traditions that continue to this day. The student designed Clark's flag that is based on the Clark family crest dating back some 400 years. The flag consists of a red cross on a gray background, which provides four quadrants. Three of these quadrants bear a symbol that supports the motto of Lee Clark College namely: "Building Community through Communication." In the bottom right quadrant is a yellow lamp representing knowledge; in the top right quadrant is a cross that symbolizes faith; in the top left quadrant is the Murray State University mascot, the Racer. The bottom left quadrant was left open as the early designers felt that later students would add their own symbol to the flag.

Clark Hall
Lee Clark Hall is a four-story building with four-person suite-style rooms, two-person double rooms, private rooms, study lounges, two common rooms, one community kitchen, and multiple Pool and Ping-Pong tables. There are approximately 1,300 students assigned to Clark with about 300 actually living within Clark Hall.

Floor Structure 
 First Floor North - Coed
 First Floor South - Coed
 Second Floor North - Coed
 Second Floor South - Coed
 Third Floor North - Women
 Third Floor South - Men
 Fourth Floor North - Men
 Fourth Floor South - Women

Traditions

Intramural sports
Clark fields several competitive intramural sports teams including softball, flag football, volleyball, basketball, water polo, ultimate frisbee, dodgeball, golf, and soccer.  Clark has always maintained an intense rivalry with Richmond College, because for the first decade of the residential colleges existence, both colleges  were of approximately the same size and located in very close proximity.

Faculty dinners
Once each month, students and faculty members of Clark College gather in the dining hall in an area identified by a large mobile Clark coat of arms.  They eat dinner together as a group and discuss a wide range of topics including academics and current events.

Clarkstock
Clarkstock is an annual music festival that takes place in the spring.  The event takes place on the Intramural Fields in front of Clark College.  The event allows local bands to play with Murray State students while raising money for charity.  In addition to music, food is also available, and games like cornhole and volleyball are played. The format of Clarkstock is based on Woodstock.

Staff

Residence Directors
Residence Directors perform a wide range of functions in providing leadership for the Residential College . They are the initiators-energizers who help set the tone for the Residential College. Their role is manager and educator. The Residence Director is responsible for student personnel, management operations, facility maintenance, staff development, and fiscal management
 1. Kelley McClure (August 1996-May 1998)
 2. Jeremy Buchanan (August 1998-May 2000)
 3. Andie Sanders (August 2000-May 2002)
 4. Ken Ashlock (August 2002-May 2005)
 5. Robbie Croft (August 2005-February 2007)
 6. Jon Laventure (February 2007-December 2007)
 7. Jennifer McPherson (January 2008-December 2009)
 8. Brandon Hester (January 2010-May 2010)
 9. Megan Lewis (2010-2012)
 10. Peter Hausladen (August 2012-May 2014)
 11. Hannah Barney (August 2014-June 2016)
 12. Emily Smith (July 2016-June 2018)
 13. Taylor Wright (July 2018-June 2020)
 14. Daphne Jackson (July 2020-December 2020)                    
 15. Shannon Eaton (January 2020-June 2022)
 16. Sherard Anabwani (July 2022-present)

College Heads
College Heads are tenured professors who spend half of their time in the Residential College . They each have an office in their Residential College and they are available to assist students. College Heads work with the Residence Directors, RAs and Residential College Council to provide overall leadership and direction for the Residential Colleges. 
 1. Dr. Stephen Horwood (August 1996–May 2009)
 2. Dr. Bert Siebold (August 2009–May 2013)
 3. Dr. Ginny Richerson (August 2013–May 2014)
 4. Dr. John Dressler (August 2014-May 2015)
 5. Dr. Chris Trzepacz (August 2015-Present)

Resident Advisors
Resident Advisors (RAs) live with the residents on each floor or wing. They are student staff members selected on the basis of their skills, interests, and activities that enable them to assist and advise students in obtaining the most from their experience at Murray State University . Each Resident Advisor is trained in student referrals with academic and personal concerns. This is the most important staff member for your son or daughter to get to know.

Residential College Council
The Lee Clark Residential College Council (RCC) is a self-governing body made up of residents, staff and commuters. The Council hosts events in the college and promotes and participates in events hosted by the university. Some of these events are intramural sports, cook-outs, and other social events. The meetings are open to all residents and members of Lee Clark College.

Presidents 
 1) Jeffery Sloan (1996-1997)
 2) Rebecca Heffner (1997-2000)
 3) Bradley Rogers (2000-2001)
 4) Gary Atkerson (2001-2002)
 5) Kylee Littlepage (2002-2003)
 6) Alyssa Denning (2003-2004)
 7) Bethany Ziegemeir (2004-2005)
 8) Heather Stroupe (Spring 2005)
 9) Miranda Morris (2005 - 2006)
 10) Aaron J Butler (Spring 2006)
 11) Kathe Payne-Boget (2007-2008)
 12) Whitney York (2008-2009)
 13) Melissa Korba (2009-2010)
 14) Xandi Claypoole (Fall 2010)
 15) Thomas Pool (2011-2013)
 16) Andrew Green (Fall 2013)
 17) Trevor Cardwell (Spring 2014)
 18) Blake Pearson (2014-2015)
 19) Sawyer Rambo (2015-2016)
 20) Patrick Hooks (2016-2017)
 21) Kendall Clark (2017-2019)
 22) Meghan Walker (2019-2020)
 23) Lauren Morgan (2020-2022)
 24) Madeline Oxendine (2022-present)

References

University and college dormitories in the United States
Murray State University
Educational institutions established in 1996
1996 establishments in Kentucky